Hoad's Wood is an  biological Site of Special Scientific Interest west of Ashford in Kent.

Natural England described the woodland thus: "This site is a good example of a pedunculate oak-hornbeam woodland on Wealden Clay [comprising] mainly hornbeam coppice-with-standards and oakhazel woodland with some sweet chestnut coppice. There is an outstanding assemblage of insects: moths and butterflies are particularly well documented. The wood also supports a diverse breeding bird community." Birds breeding in the wood include nightingale, woodcock, nuthatch, greatspotted woodpecker and several kinds of tits and warblers.

The site is private land with no public access.

In March 2021, the woodland was the site where the remains of Sarah Everard were found after her abduction and murder.

References

Sites of Special Scientific Interest in Kent
Forests and woodlands of Kent